Restless Soul is the sixth studio album by Scottish alternative folk duo The Proclaimers, released in 2005 on their own label Persevere Records.

Recording 
Restless Soul was recorded in April and May 2005 at Good Luck Studios in London, England and produced by Mark Wallis.

Music

Stylistic content 
The style of the title-track "Restless Soul" has drawn a likening to that of Dexys Midnight Runners.

Critical reception 

In a mixed review, James Monger of AllMusic opined the album to be over-reliant on "mid-tempo balladry" and the keyboard parts as "dated", but nevertheless acknowledged "bright spots", lauding "When Love Struck You Down" as a "spirited opener [...] with an infectious melody".

Track listing 
All songs written by Craig & Charlie Reid.

Personnel
The Proclaimers
Charlie Reid – acoustic guitar, vocals
Craig Reid – harmonica, vocals
with:
Zac Ware – guitar
Garry John Kane – bass
Stevie Christie – keyboards, accordion
Ross McFarlane – drums
David Ruffy, Mark Wallis – percussion, programming, arrangements

References

2005 albums
The Proclaimers albums
Self-released albums